

Red Sand (aka Red Sand Dunes) is an area of red desert sand dunes near Riyadh, Saudi Arabia.

The area is a popular destination among Saudis, expatriates, and Filipino workers. Organized tours and other activities are available.

See also
 Geography of Saudi Arabia
 Thumamah National Park

References

External links

 Red Sand Dune – Riyadh, Saudi Arabia on YouTube

Deserts of Saudi Arabia
Geography of Riyadh
Tourist attractions in Riyadh
Riyadh Province